Herbert Clay Scurlock (March 11, 1875 – September 26, 1952) was an American biochemist and pioneer in the application of radiation therapy for treating cancer and in the use of X-rays for dental diagnosis.

Life 
Scurlock was born in Fayetteville, North Carolina, in 1875, to George Cornelius Scurlock (1852–1937) and Nannie Sanders Scurlock (1856–1928). He had two siblings, the photographer Addison Norton Scurlock (1883–1964),  and Mattie G Scurlock (1887–1959). He graduated in chemistry at Livingstone College, in Salisbury, in 1895. In 1900, he got a degree in medicine from Howard University, and a master of arts from Columbia University, in 1915.

From 1900 to 1905, Scurlock worked as an assistant in chemistry and lecturer in electrotherapy and X-ray at Howard University College of Medicine. He taught chemistry and physics for a brief stint, returning later to the College of Medicine as full professor of the department of  physiological chemistry 

He was a member of the Medico-Chirurgical Society of the District of Columbia, of which he was its president in 1916. He was also a member of the American Chemical Society, the American Association for the Advancement of Science and of the National Medical Association.

Death 
After two years struggling with illness, Scurlock died in September 26, 1952, in Washington D.C., with 77 years old, having worked for 40 years at Howard University. His body was buried in the Lincoln Memorial Cemetery, in Suitland-Silver Hill, Maryland. Herbert left a wife, Mabel S. Scurlock, a son, Herbert S. Scurlock, and four daughters, Dorothea Dedmon, Helen Brown, Nina E. Mundy and Mabel E. Lewis.

References

1952 deaths
1875 births
People from Fayetteville, North Carolina
Howard University alumni
Howard University faculty
Columbia University alumni
20th-century American biochemists
Scientists from North Carolina
Livingstone College alumni
African-American chemists
20th-century African-American scientists